Brooklyn Community Board 15 is a New York City community board that encompasses the Brooklyn neighborhoods of Gravesend, Sheepshead Bay, Manhattan Beach, Gerritsen Beach, Madison, Homecrest, and Plum Beach. It is delimited by Corbin Place, Coney Island Avenue, Avenue Y, 86th street, Avenue U and McDonald Avenue, Avenue P and Kings Highway on the north, Nostrand avenue and Marine Park on the east, as well as by the Atlantic Ocean on the south. 

Its current chairman is Theresa Scavo. As of the United States Census, 2000, the Community Board has a population of 160,319, up from 143,477 in 1990 and 149,570 in 1980. Of them (as of 2000), 121,052 (75.5%) are White non Hispanic, 4,823 (3.0%) are African-American, 20,229 (12.6%) Asian or Pacific Islander, 123 (0.1%) American Indian or Native Alaskan, 340 (0.2%) of some other race, 3,506 (2.2%) of two or more race, 10,246 (6.4%) of Hispanic origins.
26.6% of the population benefit from public assistance as of 2004, up from 16.1% in 2000.

References

External links 
Profile of the Community Board (PDF)
Brooklyn neighborhood map
Elected Officials

Community boards of Brooklyn
Sheepshead Bay, Brooklyn